The Lido Ground, currently known as the Marstons Stadium for sponsorship purposes, is a field sports stadium located on Princess Margaret Way in Aberavon, Wales.

Facilities 

It has a capacity of 4,200 (601 seated) and is the home of Afan Lido F.C. The record attendance at the stadium for a Welsh Premier League game is 509, against Port Talbot Town on Boxing Day 2001. The record Welsh Football League attendance is 546 on 24 January 2009 against Goytre United F.C. Both of the record crowds occurred during high-profile derby games.

References

 Afan Lido's Ground

External links
 Afan Lido F.C.

Football venues in Wales
Sport in Neath Port Talbot
Buildings and structures in Neath Port Talbot
Stadiums in Wales
Tourist attractions in Neath Port Talbot